Salafchegan (also romanized as Salafchagan; also known as Salafcheqān, Sarafchekān, Sarafjagān, and Sarafjakan) is a city in and the capital of Salafchegan District, in Qom County, Qom Province, Iran. At the 2006 census, its population was 707, in 211 families.

References 

Qom County

Cities in Qom Province